The County of Two Hills No. 21 is a municipal district in east-central Alberta, Canada. Located in Census Division No. 10, its municipal office is located in the Town of Two Hills.

History 
The County of Two Hills No. 21 was formed in 1963 through the amalgamation of the Municipal District of Eagle No. 81 and the Two Hills School Division.

Geography

Communities and localities 
The following urban municipalities are surrounded by the County of Two Hills No. 21.
Cities
none
Towns
Two Hills
Villages
Myrnam
Summer villages
none

The following hamlets are located within the County of Two Hills No. 21.
Hamlets
Beauvallon
Brosseau
Derwent (dissolved from village status on September 1, 2010)
Duvernay
Hairy Hill (dissolved from village status in 1996)
Morecambe
Musidora
Willingdon (dissolved from village status on September 1, 2017)

The following localities are located within the County of Two Hills No. 21.
Localities 
Boian
Desjarlais
Ispas
Kaleland
Maughan
Norma
Pathfinder
Plain Lake
Raychuk Subdivision
Rusylvia
Shalka
Shepenge
Slawa
Soda Lake
Stubno

Demographics 

In the 2016 Census of Population conducted by Statistics Canada, the County of Two Hills No. 21 had a population of 3,322 living in 1,105 of its 1,499 total private dwellings, a  change from its 2011 population of 3,160.

See also 
List of communities in Alberta
List of municipal districts in Alberta

References

External links 

 
Two Hills
Ukrainian-Canadian culture in Alberta